Prehistoric settlement of Great Britain and Ireland may refer to 
Prehistoric Britain
Prehistoric Ireland